Westport station is a Baltimore Light Rail station in Baltimore, Maryland. It is located north of Smith Cove on the west side of the Patapsco River in Baltimore's the Westport neighborhood. It currently has no free public parking but has connections to MTA Maryland buses 27 and 51.

Station layout

References

External links
Schedules
Kent Street entrance from Google Maps Street View

Baltimore Light Rail stations
Westport, Baltimore
Railway stations in Baltimore